Shlomo Amar (born 24 November 1935) is an Israeli former politician who served as a member of the Knesset for Yahad and the Alignment between 1984 and 1988.

Biography
Amar was born in Haifa during the Mandate era. He started working at the Egged bus company in 1950, eventually becoming a member of its secretariat.

He was elected to the Knesset on the Yahad list in the 1984 elections, with the party joining the Alignment shortly afterwards. He lost his seat in the 1988 elections.

References

External links

1935 births
Politicians from Haifa
Jews in Mandatory Palestine
Members of the 11th Knesset (1984–1988)
Living people
Yahad (defunct political party) politicians
Alignment (Israel) politicians